Littoridina gaudichaudii is a species of small freshwater snail with a gill and an operculum, an aquatic gastropod mollusk in the family Cochliopidae. 

This species is endemic to Ecuador. It is declared extinct.

References

Further reading 
 Pilsbry H. A. (1905-1911). Non-marine mollusca of Patagonia. In: Hatcher J. B. & Scott W. B.  Reports of the Princeton University Expeditions to Patagonia, 1896-1899. 3(2): page 550. Princeton and Stuttgart.
 Eydoux J.F.T. & Souleyet L.F.A. (1852). Voyage autour du monde exécuté pendant les années 1836 et 1837 sur la corvette La Bonite commandée par M. Vaillant. Zoologie, Tome Deuxième. 664 pp., Paris (Arthus Bertrand)

Cochliopidae
Gastropods described in 1852
Taxonomy articles created by Polbot